Home Beyond the Sun is a 2004 film about a fight for freedom, and a search for truth.

Plot

Home Beyond the Sun is the story of persecution, faith, and escaping a world of fear. Bible-college student Jenna goes to teach in an area of China where her faith is forbidden. She discovers an orphanage, befriends Chinese orphan Chu Lee, and tries to help her get adopted by a family in the United States. Unfortunately, the Chinese police strenuously forbid this when they discover that Jenna and the prospective adoptive family are Christians.

Cast
 Melyssa Ade - Jenna
 Stan Coles - Pastor Dan
 Von Flores - Colonel Khan
 Dana Ishiura - Ehr Neung
 Molly Sayers - Chu Lee
 Mung-Ling Tsui - Mei Ming
 Nobby Suzuki - Chu's Grandfather
 Jason Vu - Chinese student

Awards

2004 Best Dramatic Film WYSIWYG Film Festival

12+ Seal by The Dove Foundation

References

External links
 
 

2004 television films
2004 films
2004 drama films
Canadian drama television films
English-language Canadian films
Films set in China
Pure Flix Entertainment films
2000s Canadian films